The Alassio International  or Internazionale di Alassio was a combined men's and women's clay court tennis tournament founded in 1925 at Alassio,  Liguria, Northern Italy. The tournament was staged at the Hanbury Tennis Club (f.1923) until 1940, and was part of the Italian Riviera circuit of tennis tournaments.

History
In 1923 Daniel Hanbury founded the “Hanbury Tennis Club” with a historic Club House, opened by the great tennis player Henry Lacoste. The Alassio International tennis tournament  was a combined men's and women's clay court tennis tournament founded in 1925 at Savona, Liguria, Northern Italy. The tournament was staged until 1940.  

This tournament held two versions of the event the most important being the spring edition usually held in April, and a second but brief Alassio International Summer Tournament held a few times in the early 1930s. The tournament was staged until 1940 when it ended due to World War II.

Fomer winners of the men's singles included; Placido Gaslini (1925), Jacques Brugnon (1929), Pat Hughes (1930), Béla von Kehrling (1932),  Giovanni Palmieri (1933-1936), Vojtěch Vodička (1937) and Francesco Romanoni (1940). The women's single was previously won by Dorothy Holman (1925), Lucia Valerio (1928, 1930), Dorothy Andrus (1932), Cilly Aussem (1934) and Gracyn Wheeler (1939).

Venue
The  Alassio International was held at the Hanbury Tennis Club (f.1923) by Daniel Hanbury. It encompasses twelve thousand square meters of greenery surrounding the 7 tennis courts, the elegant colonial-style club house.

Finals

Men's singles
(* denotes spring edition ** denotes summer edition)

Women's singles
(* denotes spring edition ** denotes summer edition)

References

Clay court tennis tournaments
Defunct tennis tournaments in Italy